St. James Episcopal Church is a historic Episcopal church located at Watkins Glen in Schuyler County, New York.  It was built in 1864, and is a Gothic Revival style brick church.  It has a high pitched gable roof, buttresses, and long pointed arched windows.  It features a three-stage square entrance tower and belfry added in 1866.  The chancel was expanded in 1878.

It was listed on the National Register of Historic Places in 2012.

References

External links
church website

Episcopal church buildings in New York (state)
19th-century Episcopal church buildings
Churches on the National Register of Historic Places in New York (state)
Gothic Revival church buildings in New York (state)
Churches completed in 1864
Churches in Schuyler County, New York
National Register of Historic Places in Schuyler County, New York